This is a list of notable individual politicians and political organizations who have publicly indicated support for Hillary Clinton in the 2016 United States presidential election.

Public officials serving below the state level and all other individuals and entities are listed only if they have a separate stand-alone article. Those who indicated their support after Hillary Clinton's presumptive nomination on June 11 are denoted with an asterisk.

Federal officials and state governors

Presidents and Vice Presidents 

{| class="wikitable sortable"
!Name
!Position
!Party
!In office
!Ref
|-
|Jimmy Carter*
|39th President
|rowspan=6|Democratic
|1977–81
|
|-
|Bill Clinton
|42nd President
|1993–2001
|
|-
|Barack Obama
|44th President
|2009–17
|
|-
|Walter Mondale
|42nd Vice President
|1977–81
|
|-
|Al Gore
|45th Vice President
|1993–2001
|
|-
|Joe Biden
|47th Vice President
|2009–17
|
|}

Federal Cabinet-level officers

State and territorial governors

U.S. Senators

U.S. Representatives

Former members of the federal judiciary 

 U. W. Clemon, Chief Judge: N.D. Ala. (1999–2006)

State officials

Executive officials

State legislators 

 Rep. Matt Claman

 Rep. Mark Cardenas
 Rep. Charlene Fernandez
 Rep. Randall Friese
 Rep. Rosanna Gabaldón
 Rep. Sally Ann Gonzales
 Sen. Katie Hobbs
 Rep. Jonathan Larkin
 Rep. Stefanie Mach
 Sen. Robert Meza
 Sen. Lynne Pancrazi
 Rep. Rebecca Rios
 Rep. Macario Saldate
 Rep. Victoria Steele (2013–16)
 Sen. Anna Tovar (2013–15)
 Rep. Bruce Wheeler

 Ass. Tom Ammiano (2008–14)
 Ass. Cheryl Brown
 Ass. Bill Dodd
 Sen. Isadore Hall III
 Sen. Tom Hayden† (1992–2000)
 Ass. Fabian Núñez, 66th Speaker (2004–08)
 Ass. John Pérez, 68th Speaker (2010–14)

 Sen. Polly Baca (1974–79)
 Sen. Gloria Tanner (1994–2000)
 Rep. Wilma Webb (1980–93)

 Sen. Bill Finch, Maj. Whip (2000–07)
 Sen. Edward M. Kennedy Jr.

 Sen. Betty Castor, Pres. pro tem. (1985–87)
 Sen. Nan Rich, Min. Leader (2010–12)
 Sen. Geraldine Thompson

 Rep. DuBose Porter (1982–2011)
 Rep. Pam Stephenson
 Sen. Curt Thompson

 Rep. Brian Cronin,  Min. Caucus Chair (2010–12)
 Rep. Wendy Jaquet, Min. Leader (1994–2012)

 Sen. James Clayborne Jr., Maj. Leader
 Rep. Gregory S. Harris*
 Rep. Michael Madigan, 67th Speaker
 Sen. Iris Martinez, Ass. Maj. Leader

'

 Sen. Adam Satchell

 Sen. Jeff Kessler, Min. Leader

Former members of state judiciaries

Municipal officials

Mayors, county executives, and tribal leaders

Municipal executive officials

Municipal legislators

Diplomats and bureaucrats

Federal departmental officials

Independent agencies and commissions

State, municipal, and tribal staffers

U.S. Ambassadors

U.S. Attorneys

U.S. Military

 Sally Brice-O'Hara, ret. 3-star Admiral, 27th Vice-Commandant (2010–12)

White House staff

International political figures

Current Heads of state and government

 Michelle Bachelet, 33rd and 35th President of Chile (Socialist Party)

 Bohuslav Sobotka, 11th Prime Minister of the Czech Republic (Social Democratic Party)

 François Hollande,* 24th President of France (Socialist Party)
 Manuel Valls, 169th Prime Minister of France (Socialist Party)

 Matteo Renzi, 56th Prime Minister of Italy (Democratic Party)

 John Key, 38th Prime Minister of New Zealand (National Party)

 Nicola Sturgeon, 5th First Minister of Scotland (Scottish National Party)

 Aleksandar Vučić, 11th Prime Minister of Serbia (Serbian Progressive Party)

 Stefan Löfven,* 33rd Prime Minister of Sweden (Social Democrats)

 Tsai Ing-wen, 7th President of the Republic of China (Democratic Progressive Party)

 Petro Poroshenko, 5th President of Ukraine (Solidarity)

Former Heads of state and government

Members of national and supranational parliaments 

Liberal Party

 Julie Bishop, 38th Foreign Minister
 Christopher Pyne, Leader of the House (2013-2019), and Minister for Defence Industry (2016-2018)

Sam Rainsy,* Finance Minister (1993–94) (Party Leader)

 John Baird, 10th Foreign Minister (2010–15)

 Alexandra Mendès*

 Søren Espersen

 Nora Berra, France (2009–14)

 Michèle Alliot-Marie, 185th Foreign Minister (2010–11)

 Katja Dörner

 Jillian van Turnhout* (2011–16)

 Lorraine Higgins* (2011–16)

 Alexander Pechtold, Government Reform Minister (2005–06) (Party Leader)

 Jesse Klaver

 Diederik Samsom

David Shearer, 33rd Leader of the Opposition (2011–13)
Megan Woods

Jami-Lee Ross
Jono Naylor

James Shaw

 Tor André Johnsen

 Shah Mehmood Qureshi, 20th Foreign Minister (2008–11)

 Farahnaz Ispahani* (2008–12)

 Pedro Sánchez* (2009–11; 2013–16)

 Annie Lööf, Enterprise Minister (2011–14) (Party Leader)

 Anna Kinberg Batra (Party Leader)

 Margot Wallström, 42nd Foreign Minister

 Zitto Kabwe* (2005–15) (Party Leader)

 January Makamba

Regional and municipal ministers, executive officials, legislators, and party leaders 

 Juan Pablo Arenaza,* Member: Buenos Aires Legislature

 Catherine Fife,* Member: Ontario Provincial Parliament

 Glen Murray, Member: Ontario Provincial Parliament

 Marie-Agnes Strack-Zimmerman,* Member: Düsseldorf Parliament

 Jorge Guajardo, Ambassador to China (2007–13)

 Ivonne Ortega, Governor of Yucatán (2007–12)

 Jozias van Aartsen, Mayor of The Hague

 Obiageli Ezekwesili, Minister of Solid Minerals (2005–06) and Education (2006-07)

 Bilawal Bhutto Zardari,* Party Chairman

 Alfons López Tena, Member: Catalan Parliament (2010–12)

 Phumzile Mlambo-Ngcuka, Under-Secretary-General of the United Nations

 Helen Zille,* Premier of the Western Cape

Democratic Party figures

DNC members and national leaders

Leaders of state and local party affiliates

Lobbyists and fundraisers

Nominees for elected office

Strategists, media advisors, operatives, speechwriters, and pollsters

Republican Party figures 

Note: Public officials belonging to the Republican Party are listed in the first section of this article

Organizations

Advocacy groups

Party and legislative groups 
Federal, state, and municipal Democratic Party chapters can be assumed to support their party's nominee.

See also 
 List of Hillary Clinton 2016 presidential campaign non-political endorsements
 List of Democrats who opposed the Hillary Clinton 2016 presidential campaign
 List of Bernie Sanders 2016 presidential campaign endorsements
 List of Donald Trump 2016 presidential campaign endorsements
 List of Republicans who opposed the Donald Trump 2016 presidential campaign
 List of Gary Johnson 2016 presidential campaign endorsements
 List of Jill Stein 2016 presidential campaign endorsements
 List of Hillary Clinton 2008 presidential campaign endorsements

Notes

References 

Endorsements, political
Clinton, Hillary, political
Clinton, Hillary, 2016, political